Malcolm X is the soundtrack to the 1992 Spike Lee film, Malcolm X.

Notes by Spike Lee
The album inner sleeve contains the following note from director Spike Lee:

Track listing

References

1992 soundtrack albums
Qwest Records soundtracks
Reprise Records soundtracks
Cultural depictions of Malcolm X
Drama film soundtracks